Stefan Ilić (born 7 April 1995) is a Serbian professional footballer who last played as a forward for Indian club Mohammedan Sporting.

Club career
He represented the Serbia U-20 team, that took part in the Youth World Cup 2015. Serbia finished as the champion of the Championship that season. He also played for the heavyweight Serbian Club Red Star Belgrade. In the 2020–21 season, he joined and appeared with Serbian first division club OFK Bačka.

In June 2021, he moved to India and signed with I-League side Mohammedan Sporting for their 2021–22 season. He was part of the team's 2021 Durand Cup campaign, in which he appeared in all the matches, and reached to the final, defeating FC Bengaluru United 4–2. On 3 October 2021, they lost the title winning match 1–0 to ISL side FC Goa.

Ilić also appeared in the 2021–22 Calcutta Premier Division league, in which Mohammedan reached to the final, defeating United SC 1–0.

International career
Ilić represented Serbia U20 national team at the 2015 FIFA U-20 World Cup, where the clinched the title, winning gold medal.

Honours

International
Serbia U20
 FIFA U-20 World Cup: 2015

Club
Mohammedan Sporting
 Durand Cup runner-up: 2021

References

External links
 
 
 

Sportspeople from Kragujevac
1995 births
Living people
Serbian footballers
Serbia youth international footballers
Association football forwards
FK Spartak Subotica players
Red Star Belgrade footballers
FK Radnički Niš players
FK Bežanija players
FK Metalac Gornji Milanovac players
OFK Bačka players
Mohammedan SC (Kolkata) players
Serbian SuperLiga players
Serbian First League players
Serbian expatriate footballers
Expatriate footballers in India
Serbian expatriate sportspeople in India
Calcutta Football League players